Green Valley Educational Institute (estd. 1991) is a co-educational, K-12 school in the Illahi Bagh neighbourhood of Srinagar in Jammu and Kashmir, India. It was established in 1991, and now has approximately 3500 students, 90 buses in fleet and 350 teaching faculty on its campus.

Overview

Staff
The school has academic and non-academic staff. The supervisory board oversees in student development.

Courses offered
Classes are from Nursery to Grade 12th. At (10 + 2) level, the school offers courses for :
 Medical
 Non Medical
 Commerce
 Humanities

Among other subjects, English, Functional English, Mathematics, Physics, Chemistry Biotechnology, Computer Science, and Information Technology are available.

Other facilities
 Library and resource centers
 Laboratories for study and experimentation
 Remediation and counseling centers
 Infirmary and medical services for students
 Auditorium, playing courts and smart classrooms.

Sports
The Green Valley Sports Department has won laurels in many sports disciplines. The school has a football club Green Valley FC that plays in the B Division of the Jammu Kashmir Football League.

Publications

The Evergreen
The first edition of the school magazine The Evergreen was released on 7 December 2013. It contains articles written by students and teachers, news, events and activities of the school. The articles are written in English as well as Urdu and Kashmiri.

References

Education in Srinagar
Srinagar
Srinagar district
Schools in Jammu and Kashmir